Route 142 is a  south–north state highway in western Massachusetts. From its southern terminus at Route 10 in Bernardston, Route 142 runs north through Bernardston and Gill in the first . Then it proceeds through the portion of Northfield west of the Connecticut River before crossing the state line, where the highway continues as Vermont Route 142.

Route description 

Route 142 begins at an intersection with Route 10 in the town of Bernardston, a bit northeast of downtown. Route 142 proceeds north through Bernardston as Mount Hermon Station Road, crossing into the town of Gill and the community of Mount Hermon Station after crossing nearby railroad tracks. The route parallels the tracks for a short distance, soon turning north and passing Lower Pond. On the other side of Old Vernon Road, Route 142 passes east of Upper Pond, crossing directly through the center of a nearby quarry in Northfield.

After the quarry, Route 142 turns north again, paralleling the railroad tracks and further east, the Connecticut River. The two-lane road crosses past a number of residences, soon reaching a junction with Garrish Road, where it makes a sudden turn to the northwest. Almost immediately after the turn, Route 142 reaches the Vermont state line, becoming VT 142 (Fort Bridgman Road) on the opposite side towards downtown Vernon, Vermont.

Major intersections

References

External links 

142